Berard of Carbio, O.F.M. was a thirteenth-century Franciscan friar who was executed in Morocco for attempting to promote Christianity. He and his companions, Peter, Otho, Accursius, and Adjutus, are venerated as Catholic saints and considered the Franciscan Protomartyrs. Expelled from the kingdom twice, they returned each time and continued to preach against Islam. In anger and frustration, the king finally beheaded them.

Life
According to tradition, Berard was born into a noble family of Leopardi, and was a native of Carbio in Umbria, a province of the Papal States. He was received into the newly founded Franciscan Order by St. Francis of Assisi in 1213. On the conclusion of the Second General Chapter of the Franciscan friars in 1219, Francis believed the time had then come for the friars of his Order to extend their apostolic labors beyond the Italian peninsula and northern Europe. Berard was well versed in Arabic, was an eloquent preacher, and was chosen by Francis, together with two other priests, Peter and Otho, and two lay brothers, Accursius and Adjutus, to evangelize in Morocco.

The five missionaries set sail from Italy and arriving in Portugal, crossed into Spain and then to Seville, then still under Muslim rule, where their preaching antagonized the king. After imprisoning them for some three weeks, he expelled them to the Kingdom of Morocco. The only one of the five who knew any Arabic was Berard, and their open preaching of the Christian religion and their bold denunciation of Islam soon caused them to be viewed as insane. The king ordered them escorted to Ceuta and put aboard ships bound for Christian lands. However, the friars left the ships, returned to Morocco, and resumed preaching. They were then released and given guides to take them to Christian territory, but they once again returned. When it became clear that they would neither go away nor stop preaching, they were apprehended and cast into prison. Having vainly endeavored to persuade them to abandon their Catholic faith, the Moorish king, in a fit of rage, beheaded them with his scimitar, making them the first martyrs of the Franciscan Order.

When he heard of their deaths, Francis is reported to have said, "Now at least do I have true Friars Minor!" Upon the return of their bodies to Portugal, they were solemnly processed from there all the way to Assisi. A young Portuguese canon regular was so moved by their sacrifice when he saw this caravan pass by his monastery that he joined the Franciscan Order; he would later be known as Anthony of Padua.

Veneration
Berard and his companions were canonized by Pope Sixtus IV in 1481. Their joint feast day is celebrated within the Franciscan Order on 16 January.

References

External links
 Santi Berardo, Otone, Pietro, Accursio e Adiuto Protomartiri dell’Ordine dei Frati Minori
 Fonti Protomartiri Francescani
  Iconografia Protomartiri Francescani e s. Antonio
 Antonius von Padua - mentioned in the entry for Saint Anthony
  Jubilee year marking the eighth centenary of the arrival of the Franciscans in Morocco

1220 deaths
People from Umbria
Italian Friars Minor
Franciscan martyrs
Franciscan saints
13th-century Italian Roman Catholic priests
13th-century Christian saints
13th-century Roman Catholic martyrs
Christian saints killed by Muslims
Medieval Italian saints
Year of birth unknown